The Haryana Institute of Civil Aviation (HICA) is a Government of Haryana undertaking that operates 3 flying clubs in the state of Haryana to impart pilot training.

The current minister for the 2014-2019 term is Ram_Bilas_Sharma_(politician).

Flying clubs

The Haryana Institute of Civil Aviation operates the following 3 flying clubs providing flight training for aspiring pilots.

 Hisar Aviation Club at Hisar Airport: As of July 2016, Hisar based Aviation flying club had two aircraft, a 4-seater Cessna 172 built in 2008 and an old 2-seater Cessna 152 built in 1986. The institutes has 15 approved seats to impart training for the commercial pilot licence (CPL) and private pilot licence (PPL). The CPL requires a minimum of 200 hours flying experience. In September 2019, Spice Jet also started a flight training academy at Hisar airport with 10 training aircraft to train 100 pilots every year. 4 girls with state domicile and 10% students with Haryana domicile will get 50% waiver on tuition fee, SpiceJet will place 70% of the 100 pilot trainees within its own organisation.
 Pinjore Aviation Club at Kalka Airport
 Karnal Flying Club at Karnal Airport

Pilot License Courses offered
The HICA offers flying training and preparation courses to pilots for the following Directorate General of Civil Aviation licenses':
 Student pilot license
 Private pilot licence
 Commercial pilot license
 Glider pilot license

The Government of Haryana provides subsidies for the above to the natives of the state of Haryana who must apply for it using a Haryana Domicile Certificate.

See also 
 List of pilot training institutes in India
 List of schools in Hisar
 List of universities and colleges in Hisar
 List of institutions of higher education in Haryana

References

Aviation schools in Haryana
Institute of Civil Aviation
Universities and colleges in Haryana
Universities and colleges in Hisar (city)